Vishnu is a 2003 Indian Telugu-language action romance film directed by Shaji Kailas (his Telugu debut) and produced by Mohan Babu and starring his son Manchu Vishnu and Shilpa Anand. The screenplay is by Paruchuri Brothers, and the music is composed by Ismail Darbar. The film was released on 3 October 2003.

Plot 
Vishnu (Manchu Vishnu) meets his childhood love after fifteen years and tries to woo her without revealing his true identity. But it leads to a misunderstanding and her father fixes her marriage elsewhere.

Cast
 Manchu Vishnu as Vishnu
 Ohanna Shivanand as Vaishnavi / Vedika
 Neetu Chandra as Teju, Vishnu's friend
 Brahmanandam
 Sai Kumar 
 Giri Babu
 Jayasudha
 Rajeev Kanakala
 Murali Mohan
 Siva Parvathi
 Telangana Shakuntala
 Chitram Seenu
 Dharmavarapu Subramanyam
 Tanikella Bharani
 Abhinaya Krishna
 Deepak Jethi
 Ramya Sri as Kanakam

Soundtrack

References

External links
 

2003 films
2000s masala films
Indian romantic action films
2000s Telugu-language films
Films scored by Ismail Darbar
2000s romantic action films
Films directed by Shaji Kailas